The 2017–18 season was Unione Calcio Sampdoria's 61st season in Serie A, and their 6th consecutive season in the top-flight. The club competed in Serie A and in the Coppa Italia, finishing 10th in the league after spending most of the campaign in 6th, and being eliminated in the latter competition in the round of 16.

The season was the second in charge for former Empoli manager Marco Giampaolo. Veteran Italian striker Fabio Quagliarella was the club's top scorer, with 19 league goals.

Players

Squad information

Transfers

In

Loans in

Out

Loans out

Pre-season and friendlies

Competitions

Serie A

League table

Results summary

Results by round

Matches

Coppa Italia

Statistics

Appearances and goals

|-
! colspan=14 style=background:#dcdcdc; text-align:center| Goalkeepers

|-
! colspan=14 style=background:#dcdcdc; text-align:center| Defenders

|-
! colspan=14 style=background:#dcdcdc; text-align:center| Midfielders

|-
! colspan=14 style=background:#dcdcdc; text-align:center| Forwards

|-
! colspan=14 style=background:#dcdcdc; text-align:center| Players transferred out during the season

Goalscorers

Last updated: 20 May 2018

Clean sheets

Last updated: 20 May 2018

Disciplinary record

Last updated: 20 May 2018

References

U.C. Sampdoria seasons
Sampdoria